The World Series Of Mahjong (Chinese:世界麻将大赛) is a privately sponsored Mahjong tournament. Both men and women are eligible to contest this title, and the top finishers receive prize money with the champion also receiving a necklace. The tournament system competition takes place over a few days. Contestants must pay an entry fee and must provide proof that they are at least the age of 21.

History
The World Series Of Mahjong (WSOM) was established by World Mahjong Ltd.(WML) in 2007. Chunglai Hui, a designer from Hong Kong, won the first tournament. Following tournaments were held in 2008, 2010, and 2015.

Rule set
The rules for the tournament were developed by Alan Kwan as a slight modification of his Zung Jung (中庸) pattern-based scoring system. The tournament uses sets of 136 tiles, excluding the bonus flower tiles, and pairs of dice. Prevailing wind is not recognized.

Champions
The names are ordered as Given name and Surname.

Venues

See also
Mahjong
World Mahjong Organization
World Mahjong Championship

References

External links
World Series Of Mahjong

Mahjong world championships